Giambattista Grossi (died 28 March 1569) was a Roman Catholic prelate who served as Bishop of Reggio Emilia (1549–1569).

Biography
On 4 December 1545, Giambattista Grossi was appointed during the papacy of Pope Paul III as Coadjutor Bishop of Reggio Emilia.
On 22 January 1549, he succeeded to the bishopric. He served as Bishop of Reggio Emili until his death on 28 March 1569.

References

External links and additional sources
 (for Chronology of Bishops) 
 (for Chronology of Bishops) 

16th-century Italian Roman Catholic bishops
Bishops appointed by Pope Paul III
1569 deaths